

N01A Anesthetics, general

N01AA Ethers
N01AA01 Diethyl ether
N01AA02 Vinyl ether

N01AB Halogenated hydrocarbons
N01AB01 Halothane
N01AB02 Chloroform
N01AB04 Enflurane
N01AB05 Trichloroethylene
N01AB06 Isoflurane
N01AB07 Desflurane
N01AB08 Sevoflurane

N01AF Barbiturates, plain
N01AF01 Methohexital
N01AF02 Hexobarbital
N01AF03 Thiopental
QN01AF90 Thiamylal

N01AG Barbiturates in combination with other drugs
N01AG01 Narcobarbital

N01AH Opioid anesthetics
N01AH01 Fentanyl
N01AH02 Alfentanil
N01AH03 Sufentanil
N01AH04 Phenoperidine
N01AH05 Anileridine
N01AH06 Remifentanil
N01AH51 Fentanyl, combinations

N01AX Other general anesthetics
N01AX03 Ketamine
N01AX04 Propanidid
N01AX05 Alfaxalone
N01AX07 Etomidate
N01AX10 Propofol
N01AX11 Sodium oxybate
N01AX13 Nitrous oxide
N01AX14 Esketamine
N01AX15 Xenon
N01AX63 Nitrous oxide, combinations
QN01AX91 Azaperone
QN01AX92 Benzocaine
QN01AX93 Tricaine mesilate
QN01AX94 Isoeugenol
QN01AX99 Other general anesthetics, combinations

N01B Anesthetics, local

N01BA Esters of aminobenzoic acid
N01BA01 Metabutethamine
N01BA02 Procaine
N01BA03 Tetracaine
N01BA04 Chloroprocaine
N01BA05 Benzocaine
N01BA52 Procaine, combinations
N01BA53 Tetracaine, combinations

N01BB Amides
N01BB01 Bupivacaine
N01BB02 Lidocaine
N01BB03 Mepivacaine
N01BB04 Prilocaine
N01BB05 Butanilicaine
N01BB06 Cinchocaine
N01BB07 Etidocaine
N01BB08 Articaine
N01BB09 Ropivacaine
N01BB10 Levobupivacaine
N01BB20 Combinations
N01BB51 Bupivacaine, combinations
N01BB52 Lidocaine, combinations
N01BB53 Mepivacaine, combinations
N01BB54 Prilocaine, combinations
N01BB57 Etidocaine, combinations
N01BB58 Articaine, combinations
N01BB59 Bupivacaine and meloxicam

N01BC Esters of benzoic acid
N01BC01 Cocaine

N01BX Other local anesthetics
N01BX01 Ethyl chloride
N01BX02 Dyclonine
N01BX03 Phenol
N01BX04 Capsaicin

References

N01